Cơm nắm is a Vietnam rice dish of the Miền Bắc region that is shaped into a roll. The dish is commonly carried by those traveling to unfamiliar areas without restaurants or ingredients familiar to them.

Varieties
Cơm nắm muối vừng - rice balls with salt and sesame
Cơm nắm lá cọ Phù Ninh - rice balls in palm leaf of Phù Ninh District

References

See also
Onigiri

Vietnamese rice dishes